Damon Fowler is an American electric blues and blues rock singer, guitarist, and songwriter. Allmusic noted that "his sound is blues based, but there are hints of country, swamp rock, R&B, and swing in his playing and song writing."

Over the years, Fowler has worked with Delbert McClinton, Chris Duarte, Buddy Guy, Johnny Winter, Edgar Winter, Jeff Beck, Robin Trower, Gregg Allman, Junior Brown, Rick Derringer, Little Feat, Jimmie Vaughan, Victor Wainwright, Butch Trucks, Dickey Betts and the Radiators.

Life and career
Fowler was born in Brandon, Florida, United States. His first association with the guitar began at the age of twelve, and by experience has expanded his skills and range to include playing acoustic, electric, lap steel, and dobro, incorporating slide techniques. In his teenage years, Fowler played at small clubs in the Tampa Bay Area. With a growing local reputation, he began to appear as a support act, both on other musicians tours and at music festivals. His debut album, Riverview Drive (1999), was self-released and included material all written by Fowler. Rick Derringer both played on, and produced the record. Further self releases of Roots and Branches (2000) and the live album, Live at Skipper's Smoke House (2003) followed, which gained Fowler critical notice from the music press.

In March 2007, Blind Pig Records announced the signing of Fowler. His first issue with them was the largely blues based album, Sugar Shack (2009). Billboard commented that "Fowler may be so skillful that he prefers pickin' tasty to larger-than-life guitar heroics. Fowler wrote nine of the 12 tunes on the album, and his original material is solid." Fowler also performed at Memphis in May in 2009. Following the release of Devil Got His Way two years later, Allmusic remarked that "Fowler's creative lap steel work is what sets him apart from the rest."

Following an impromptu jam session in July 2011 in Florida, Victor Wainwright teamed up with Damon Fowler, J.P. Soars, Chuck Riley and Chris Peet to form what was to be known as Southern Hospitality. Their first gig was supporting Buddy Guy in August the same year at the Heritage Music Blues Fest in Wheeling, West Virginia. Their debut album, Easy Livin' , (2013) was produced by Tab Benoit, and released by Blind Pig Records. It peaked at No. 9 on the US Billboard Top Blues Album chart.

In August 2013, Fowler played at the Palladium Theatre in St. Petersburg, Florida.

Tab Benoit produced Sounds of Home, which was recorded in Houma, Louisiana, and released on January 21, 2014. In February 2014, Fowler appeared at the Blast Furnace Blues Festival in Bethlehem, Pennsylvania.

In September 2015, Damon joined Butch Trucks and the Freight Train Band.

Damon joined Dickey Betts Band as the slide guitar player on the 2018 Tour.

Discography

Albums

See also
List of blues rock musicians
List of soul-blues musicians
List of electric blues musicians

References

External links
Official website

Year of birth missing (living people)
Living people
American blues singers
Electric blues musicians
American blues guitarists
American male guitarists
Steel guitarists
Blues rock musicians
Songwriters from Florida
Blues musicians from Florida
People from Brandon, Florida
Guitarists from Florida
Musicians from Tampa, Florida
Blind Pig Records artists
American male songwriters